The OC Fair & Event Center (OCFEC) is a  event venue in Costa Mesa, California. The site hosts over 150 events attracting 4.3 million visitors annually, and is home to the Orange County Fair, Centennial Farm, Costa Mesa Speedway, and Pacific Amphitheatre.

The OCFEC is managed by the 32nd District Agricultural Association, a state special-purpose district in the Division of Fairs and Expositions of the California Department of Food and Agriculture formed in 1949. Its board is appointed by the Governor of California.

Facilities
 Centennial Farm is a year-round working farm for educating youth about agriculture located in the southwest of the property. The Farm has fruit and vegetable gardens as well as livestock barns. One of the barns was originally part of the Newport Harbor Buffalo Ranch, a local 1950s-era theme park that closed in 1959.
 Heroes Hall is a year-round veterans museum and education center that is dedicated to telling the stories of Orange County veterans, and is located in the southwest of the property. The museum is housed in a rehabilitated building that used to be one of the barracks on the Santa Ana Army Air Base, which was sat in the fairgrounds' current location. They have an exhibit about the old base. 
 The Equestrian Center is a year-round, privately operated horse boarding and training facility in the northeast of the site. The facility has a boarding capacity of 188 horses with four riding arenas, three hot walkers, turnout pens, storage lockers and ample parking. Center staff are available for full- or part-time training and riding lessons for people of all ability levels.
 The Orange County Market Place is an outdoor swap meet held in the southeast of the property, and is owned and operated by Spectra Food Services.
 Pacific Amphitheatre is an outdoor arena seating approximately 8,500. Its season runs from July through September. 
 Action Sports Arena is a 7,000 seat arena and performance venue activated during the annual Orange County Fair, and home to Costa Mesa Speedway events.
 The Hangar is an indoor concert venue activated during the annual Orange County Fair, and used for various year-round events including Fight Club OC.

History
The Orange County Community Fair Corporation sponsored the first county fair in 1890 in Santa Ana, the county seat. In 1894, it was taken over by another group, the Orange County Fair Association. In 1916, it was passed again to the Orange County Farm Bureau, before passing to an Orange County Fair Board in 1925, when it was relocated to Anaheim.

After World War II, the state formed the current association and purchased land then occupied by the Santa Ana Army Air Base for use as the fairgrounds, which became part of the City of Costa Mesa at the latter's incorporation in 1953.

On March 18, 2009, this venue was also the host of a town hall meeting held by President Barack Obama on his visit to Southern California. He used this opportunity to address the economic crisis and to take questions from the audience.

References

External links

OC Market Place

Event venues established in 1949
Fairgrounds in California
Sports venues in Costa Mesa, California
Tourist attractions in Orange County, California
1949 establishments in California